According to Anne Hidalgo, Mónica Fein, Célestine Ketcha Courtès and Ada Colau of The World Organization of United Cities and Local Governments (UCLG) in 2017, in an article titled "Women mayors are ready to stand up and be counted,"

18th and 19th centuries

The first woman to serve as mayor in the United States is believed to be Susanna M. Salter, who served as mayor of Argonia, Kansas, in 1887. However, the first woman recorded winning a mayoral election was Nancy Smith in 1862, who declined to be sworn in as mayor of Oskaloosa, Iowa.

20th century

21st century

See also 

 List of first women governors and/or chief ministers
 List of first women mayors in the United States
 List of the first women holders of political offices
 Women in government

References 

 
Mayors
Female
mayors
First mayors